Elivélton Viana dos Santos (born May 10, 1992), known as Elivélton, is a Brazilian footballer who plays for Santa Cruz, on loan from Boavista.

Honours
Fluminense
 Campeonato Brasileiro Série A: 2012
 Campeonato Carioca: 2012
 Taça Guanabara: 2012

References

1992 births
Living people
Brazilian footballers
Fluminense FC players
Clube Náutico Capibaribe players
Fortaleza Esporte Clube players
Tupi Football Club players
Boavista Sport Club players
Centro Sportivo Alagoano players
Vila Nova Futebol Clube players
Campeonato Brasileiro Série A players
Campeonato Brasileiro Série B players
Campeonato Brasileiro Série C players
Campeonato Brasileiro Série D players
Association football defenders
People from Bom Jardim